Barm-e Delak, is a site of a Sasanian rock relief located about 10 km southeast of Shiraz, in the Pars Province of Iran. The rock relief was known as Bahram-e Dundalk in Middle Persian, which means Bahram's heart.

History
The site is located near a river, on the eastern side of a rocky spur. It composes four reliefs.

The first relief is a family scene done in a unique style in honor to king Bahram II. It shows the king offering a lotus flower to his wife, Shapurdukhtak.

See also
 Bahram II
 Bishapour

Notes

References 
 Louis Vanden Berghe,  Encyclopædia Iranica
 Bruno Overlaet, Flower and fire altar: fact and fiction on the Barm-i Dilak rock reliefs, Iranica Antiqua 45, 2010, p. 337-352.

External links
 Jona Lendering Sasanian rock reliefs Livius.org ( accessdate=2013-08-15 ).
 Georgina Hermann & Vesta S. Curtis Sasanian rock reliefs Encyclopædia Iranica 
 Asghar Mahmoudabadi  A Review of Sassanian Images and Inscriptions Iran Chamber Society .

Archaeological sites in Iran
Architecture in Iran
3rd-century works
Buildings and structures in Fars Province
Rock reliefs in Iran
Sasanian Empire